The area that is now the American state of Iowa was part of New France when first settled by Europeans. As such, it was governed by its slavery laws. French settlers first brought African slaves into Upper Louisiana from Saint-Domingue around 1720 under the legal terms of the Code Noir, which defined the conditions of slavery in the French empire and restricted the activities of free Black persons.

At the time, nine hundred slaves lived in Upper Louisiana, as well as at least three hundred slaves the French took with them as they left for the lands west of the Mississippi River, including modern-day Iowa. The institution of slavery continued after Britain acquired the Illinois Country in 1763 following the French and Indian War.

In the 1840 United States census 16 enslaved people were recorded in Iowa Territory, all living in Dubuque County. Other sporadic accounts of slavery occurred in Iowa Territory; the only recorded slave sale occurred in 1841, when O. H. W. Stull, the Iowa territorial secretary, purchased an enslaved boy in Iowa City. Slavery was outlawed in Iowa when it obtained statehood in 1846. In the years leading up to the Civil War, many Iowans became involved in the Underground Railroad, and famed abolitionist John Brown used Iowa as a base for his anti-slavery campaigns, 1856-1859. The state of Iowa played a significant role during the American Civil War in providing food, supplies, troops and officers for the Union army.

See also 

Slavery in New France
Slavery in the United States
History of Iowa

References 

Iowa
History of racism in Iowa